This is a list of notable Minangkabau people.

Academics

 Arbi Sanit, political scientist
 Arifin Bey, social scientist
 Azyumardi Azra, social religion scientist, rector
 Deliar Noer, political scientist 
 Dewi Fortuna Anwar, political scientist
 Ismail Mohammad Ali, governor of Bank Negara Malaysia
 James Mahmud Rice, sociologist
 Moeslim Taher, rector and owner Jayabaya University 
 Riri Fitri Sari, computer scientist 
 Rustam Sani, political scientist
 Said Djauharsjah Jenie, technology scientist
 Sheikh Muszaphar Shukor, Astronaut, Malaysian orthopaedic surgeon
 Syahril Sabirin, governor of Bank Indonesia
 Syahrir, economist
 Werry Darta Taifur, economist 
 Zakiah Daradjat, Islamic psychologist

Artists
 Amrus Natalsya, realism painter, wood sculpture
 Huriah Adam, dancer, dance choreographer 
 Iwan Tirta, batik designer
 Mochtar Apin, painter
 Sutan Amrull, American make-up artist
 Whulandary Herman, model, Puteri Indonesia 2012-2013, Top 16 Miss Universe 2013
 Yunizar, painter

Athletes

 Aero Sutan Aswar, Indonesian jet skier
 Alan Martha, Indonesian football athlete 
 Ananda Mikola, Indonesian race car driver
 Aqsa Sutan Aswar, Indonesian jet skier 
 Bona Septano, Indonesian badminton athlete
 Defia Rosmaniar, Indonesian taekwondo athlete  
 Denny Sumargo, Indonesian basketball athlete
 Gitra Yuda Furton, Indonesian football athlete 
 Hari Novian Caniago, Indonesian basketball athlete 
 Hengky Ardiles, Indonesian football athlete 
 Indra Sjafri, Indonesian football athlete 
 Irsyad Maulana, Indonesian football athlete
 Jandia Eka Putra, Indonesian football athlete
 Jafri Sastra, Indonesian football coach 
 Leo Guntara, Indonesian football athlete 
 Markis Kido, Indonesian badminton athlete
 Mohammad Aidil Zafuan Abdul Radzak, Malaysian football athlete
 Mohammad Zaquan Adha Abdul Radzak, Malaysian football athlete
 Moreno Suprapto, Indonesian race car driver
 Muhammad Fauzan Jamal, Indonesian football athlete 
 Nasrul Koto, Indonesian football athlete
 Nil Maizar, Indonesian football coach and former football player
 Novrianto, Indonesian football athlete
 Novri Setiawan, Indonesian football athlete   
 Oktavianus, Indonesian football athlete 
 Pia Zebadiah Bernadet, Indonesian badminton athlete
 Raphael Maitimo, Indonesian football athlete 
 Rommy Diaz Putra, Indonesian football athlete
 Rully Desrian, Indonesian football athlete
 Silvi Antarini, Indonesian badminton athlete   
 Sutan Anwar, Indonesian football athlete
 Syamsir Alam, Indonesian football athlete
 Teja Paku Alam, Indonesian football athlete  
 Tommy Pranata, Indonesian football athlete
 Tri Rahmad Priadi, Indonesian football athlete
 Yaspi Boby, Indonesian sprinter 
 Yeyen Tumena, Indonesian football athlete
 Zahra Muzdalifah, Indonesian football athlete

Authors

 Abdul Muis, Indonesian novelist, famous novel: Salah Asuhan
 Afrizal Malna, Indonesian writer
 Ahmad Fuadi, Indonesian novelist, famous novel: Negeri 5 Menara 
 Alfian Sa'at, Singaporean writer 
 Ali Akbar Navis, Indonesian author, famous novel: Kemarau
 Gus tf Sakai, Indonesian writer
 Hamka, Islamic scholar, Indonesian novelist, famous novels: Merantau ke Deli, Tenggelamnya Kapal Van Der Wijck, Di Bawah Lindungan Ka'bah
 Idrus, Indonesian author, famous story: "Dari Ave Maria ke Jalan Lain ke Roma" 
 Karim Halim, Indonesian author 
 Marah Roesli, Indonesian novelist, famous novel: Siti Nurbaya
 Marina Mahathir, Malaysian novelist
 Motinggo Busye, Indonesian novelist, famous novel: Malam Jahanam
 Nur Sutan Iskandar, Indonesian novelist, famous novel: Hulubalang Raja
 Saadah Alim, Indonesian author 
 Sariamin Ismail, Indonesian novelist, famous novel: Kalau Tak Untung
 Sutan Takdir Alisjahbana, Indonesian novelist, famous novel: Layar Terkembang
 Tulis Sutan Sati, Indonesian novelist, famous novel: Sengsara Membawa Nikmat
 Wisran Hadi, Indonesian novelist 
 Zainal Abidin Ahmad, Malaysian writer and language experts
 Zuber Usman, Indonesian writer

Businesspeople
 Abdul Latief, owner of ALatief Corporation
 Ahmad Sahroni, owner of fuel shipping company
 Basrizal Koto, owner of Basko Group, Indonesia
 Handry Satriago, CEO of General Electric Indonesia
 Hasnul Suhaimi, CEO of Excelcomindo Pratama
 Hasyim Ning, Indonesian car assembly businessman
 Joesoef Isak, founder of Hasta Mitra publishing house
 Kamarudin Meranun, Chairman of AirAsia and CEO of the Tune Group
 Mohamed Taib bin Haji Abdul Samad, tycoon in the early history of Kuala Lumpur
 Mokhzani Mahathir, owner of Kencana Capital Sdn. Bhd 
 Nadiem Makarim, founder and CEO of Go-Jek and Indonesian government minister
 Nasimuddin Amin, Malaysian car assembly businessman
 Rinaldi Firmansyah, CEO of Telekomunikasi Indonesia
 Tunku Imran, owner of Antah Holdings, Malaysia
 Tunku Naquiyuddin, owner of Antah Holdings, Malaysia
 Tunku Tan Sri Abdullah, owner of Melewar Group, Malaysia

Composers and musicians
 Guruh Sukarnoputra, choreographer and songwriter 
 Saiful Bahri, composer and songwriter
 Wandly Yazid, composer
 Zubir Said, composer of the national anthem of Singapore, "Majulah Singapura"

Diplomats
 Dino Patti Djalal, Indonesian ambassador and deputy Foreign Minister
 Fouad Abdulhameed Alkhateeb, Saudi Arabian ambassador 
 Hasjim Djalal, Indonesian ambassador 
 Razali Ismail, Malaysian ambassador  
 Zahrain Mohamed Hashim, Malaysian ambassador

Entertainers

 Acha Septriasa, actress
 Aliando Syarief, actor, model
 Angela Nazar, actress, singer
 Atta Halilintar, actor, influencer, singer
 Awaludin, actor 
 Aznil Nawawi, actor, TV host 
 Billy Syahputra, actor, comedian
 Bunga Citra Lestari, actress, pop singer
 Camelia Malik, actress
 Christine Hakim, actress
 Dede Yusuf, actor 
 Dude Harlino, actor 
 Eva Arnaz, actress
 Hilbram Dunar, presenter 
 HIM Damsyik, actor
 Imelda Therinne, actress, model 
 Karina Nadila, actress, model
 Kirana Larasati, actress 
 Kiwil, comedian
 Laudya Chintya Bella, actress
 Marissa Anita, actress
 Marshanda, actress
 Masayu Anastasia, actress
 Melanie Putria Dewita Sari, actress and television hostess 
 Meuthia Kasim, presenter
 Nagita Slavina, actress and singer 
 Nikita Mirzani, actress, model and presenter 
 Nikita Willy, actress
 Niniek L. Karim, actress
 Nirina Zubir, actress
 Okky Lukman, comedian
 Olga Syahputra, comedian
 Raihaanun, actress
 Rano Karno, actor, governor of Banten
 Revalina Sayuthi Temat, actress
 Ria Irawan, actress 
 Shireen Sungkar, actress and singer
 Soekarno M. Noer, actor
 Sukma Ayu, actress 
 Titi Rajo Bintang, actress and musician
 Zainal Abidin, actor
 Zaskia Adya Mecca, actress
 Zaskia Sungkar, actress

Filmmakers

 Andjar Asmara, film director 
 Arizal, film director
 Asrul Sani, screenwriter
 Bachtiar Effendi, film director 
 Djamaluddin Malik, film producer
 Jajang C. Noer, film producer
 John de Rantau, film director
 Misbach Yusa Biran, film director and pioneer of Indonesian film archive
 Nan Achnas, film director 
 Nasri Cheppy, film director 
 Nia Dinata, film director  
 Roestam Sutan Palindih, film director 
 Salman Aristo, screenwriter and film director
 Upi Avianto, film director  
 Usmar Ismail, film producer
 U-Wei Haji Saari, film director

First Ladies

 Fatmawati, Indonesian first lady
 Rosmah Mansor, Malaysian first lady 
 Siti Hasmah Mohamad Ali, Malaysian first lady 
 Tuanku Bahiyah, Raja Permaisuri Agong of Malaysia and Sultanah of Kedah
 Tuanku Najihah, Raja Permaisuri Agong of Malaysia and Tunku Ampuan of Negeri Sembilan
 Tunku Kurshiah, Raja Permaisuri Agong of Malaysia and Tunku Ampuan Besar of Negeri Sembilan

Journalists
 Abdoel Rivai, journalist in colonial era and founder of Pewarta Wolanda
 Ani Idrus, founder of Waspada daily newspaper
 Atika Suri, TV newscaster and newscast producer
 Budi Putra, technology journalist
 Djamaluddin Adinegoro, journalist in the colonial era
 Desi Anwar, reporter of Metro TV
 Erwin Arnada, journalist, film director
 Mahyuddin Datuk Sutan Maharadja, early newspaper editor, journalist and intellectual
 Rohana Kudus, first Indonesian female journalist
 Rosihan Anwar, founder of Pedoman  
 Yusril Djalinus, co-founder of Tempo magazine

Monarchies
 Adityawarman, founder royal dynasty of Pagaruyung
 Antah, king of Negeri Sembilan
 Dara Jingga, Dharmasraya princess
 Dara Petak, Dharmasraya princess 
 Jaafar of Negeri Sembilan, Yang di-Pertuan Agong Malaysia 
 Melewar, king of Negeri Sembilan
 Muhammad Shah of Brunei, first sultan of Brunei
 Muhriz of Negeri Sembilan, Yang di-Pertuan Besar of Negeri Sembilan, Malaysia
 Raja Bagindo, founder Sultanate of Sulu
 Raja Sulayman, rajas of the Kingdom of Maynila

Legal system
 Arminsyah, vice attorney general of Indonesia 
 Basrief Arief, attorney general of Indonesia
 Saldi Isra, justice of the Indonesian Constitutional Court
 Sukma Violetta, deputy chairwoman of the Judicial Commission of Indonesia

Military

 Adnan Bin Saidi, Malayan World War II 1st Malay Regiment, battle of bukit candu, commander
 Cut Nyak Dhien, commander of Aceh War 
 Chappy Hakim, Indonesian Air Force's chief of the air staff 
 Daan Jahja, chief of staff of the Siliwangi Division and military governor of Jakarta
 Dato' Bahaman, Malaysian warrior
 Doni Monardo, head of Indonesian National Board for Disaster
 Kemal Idris, Indonesian commander of KOSTRAD
 Kivlan Zen, Indonesian commander of KOSTRAD
 Teuku Umar, commander of Aceh War 
 Tuanku Imam Bonjol, commander of Padri War
 Tuanku Tambusai, leader of Padri War

Politicians

 Abdul Aziz Shamsuddin, Malaysian minister
 Abdul Halim, Indonesian prime minister
 Abdullah CD, chairman of the Communist Party of Malaya
 Abdul Rahim Ishak, Singaporean government minister 
 Abdul Rahman of Negeri Sembilan, the first Yang di-Pertuan Agong Malaysia
 Abdul Samad Idris, Malaysian minister 
 Abubakar Jaar, resident of North Sumatra and West Sumatra
 Adnan Kapau Gani, deputy prime minister of Indonesia
 Agus Salim, Indonesian diplomat, former Indonesian government minister
 Ahmad Boestaman, chairman of Parti Rakyat Malaysia
 Ahmad Kanedi, mayor of Bengkulu
 Aishah Ghani, Malaysian government minister  
 Amirsham Abdul Aziz, Malaysian government minister 
 Arcandra Tahar, Indonesian government minister 
 Arifin Tasrif, Indonesian government minister 
 Armida Alisjahbana, Indonesian government minister
 Arsyadjuliandi Rachman, governor of Riau 
 Assaat, acting president of Indonesian  
 Aziz Ishak, Malaysian government minister  
 Azwar Anas, Indonesian government minister
 Bachtiar Chamsyah, Indonesian government minister
 Bagindo Azizchan, mayor of Padang
 Bahder Djohan, Indonesian government minister
 Burhanuddin al-Helmy, president of the Pan-Malaysian Islamic Party
 Bustanil Arifin, Indonesian government minister
 Chaerul Saleh, deputy prime minister of Indonesia
 Dipa Nusantara Aidit, leader of the Communist Party of Indonesia
 Emil Salim, Indonesian government minister 
 Eny Karim, Indonesian government minister 
 Erry Nuradi, governor of North Sumatra
 Fachrul Razi, Indonesian government minister
 Fadli Zon, deputy speaker of Indonesian DPR
 Fahmi Idris, Indonesian government minister
 Gamawan Fauzi, Indonesian government minister
 Ghafar Baba, deputy prime minister of Malaysia 
 Ghazali Shafie, Malaysian government minister 
 Hamdan Sheikh Tahir, Yang di-Pertua Negeri of Penang, Malaysia
 Harry Azhar Azis, chairman of the Audit Board of Indonesia 
 Harun Zain, Indonesian government minister
 Hasan Basri Durin, Indonesian government minister  
 Hazairin, Indonesian government minister 
 Irman Gusman, speaker of the Regional Representative Council (DPD) of Indonesia
 Irwan Prayitno, governor of West Sumatra, Indonesia
 Khairy Jamaluddin, Malaysian government minister 
 Mahendra Siregar, chief of Indonesian Financial Services Authority
 Mahyeldi Ansharullah, governor of West Sumatra, Indonesia 
 Marzuki Usman, Indonesian government minister 
 Megawati Sukarnoputri, Indonesian president
 Meutia Hatta, Indonesian government minister 
 Mohamad Isa, governor of South Sumatra
 Mohamad Hasan, Negeri Sembilan government minister
 Mohammad Hatta, Indonesian prime minister and the first Indonesian vice president
 Mohammad Nasroen, Indonesian government minister
 Mohammad Nazir, Indonesian government minister 
 Mokhtaruddin Lasso, founder of Parti Kebangsaan Melayu Malaya
 Muhamad Chatib Basri, Indonesian government minister
 Muhammad Djosan, governor of Maluku 
 Muhammad bin Haji Muhammad Taib, Malaysian government minister  
 Muhammad Natsir, Indonesian prime minister, founder of Masyumi Party
 Muhammad Yamin, Indonesian government minister
 Mukhriz Mahathir, Malaysian politician, Chief Minister of Kedah
 Nasrul Abit, vice governor of West Sumatra
 Nila Moeloek, Indonesian government minister
 Nova Iriansyah, governor of Aceh 
 Oesman Sapta Odang, speaker of the Regional Representative Council of Indonesia 
 Patrialis Akbar, Indonesian government minister
 Puan Maharani, Indonesian government minister 
 Rafidah Aziz, Malaysian government minister  
 Rahmah el Yunusiyah, Indonesian parliamentarian and women's education activist  
 Rais Yatim, Malaysian government minister 
 Rashid Maidin, leader of the Communist Party of Malaya
 Rasuna Said, Indonesian nationalist political leader
 Rizal Nurdin, governor of North Sumatra 
 Rizal Ramli, Indonesian government minister 
 Rustam Effendi, member of the House of Representatives of the Netherlands
 Said Rasad, mayor of Padang
 Sha'ari Tadin, member of Parliament of Singapore
 Shamsiah Fakeh, leader of the Communist Party of Malaya 
 Shaziman Abu Mansor, Malaysian government minister  
 Sjafruddin Prawiranegara, head of PDRI
 Sjarifuddin Baharsjah, Indonesian government minister 
 Sofyan Djalil, Indonesian government minister  
 Sutan Sjahrir, first Indonesian prime minister, founder of Socialist Party of Indonesia
 Tan Malaka, international communist politician
 Tarmizi Taher, Indonesian government minister 
 Taufiq Kiemas, chairman of Indonesia People's Consultative Assembly
 Tifatul Sembiring, Indonesian government minister 
 Yusof Ishak, first president of Singapore
 Yusof Rawa, president of the Pan-Malaysian Islamic Party
 Yusril Ihza Mahendra, Indonesian government minister

Poets

 Chairil Anwar, famous poems: "Aku", "Krawang-Bekasi"
 Laksmi Pamuntjak, Indonesian poet, famous poetry collection: The Anagram
 Leon Agusta, Indonesian poet
 Taufik Ismail, famous poem: "Tirani"

Religion
 Abdul Karim Amrullah, Islamic reformer
 Abdullah Ahmad, Islamic reformer
 Abdul Somad, Islamic preacher 
 Ahmad Khatib, head of the Shafi'i school of law, Mecca
 Ahmad Syafi'i Maarif, Islamic scholar, former leader of Muhammadiyah
 Ilyas Yakoub, ulama, politician
 Mahmud Yunus, Islamic scholar 
 Muhammad Amrullah, Islamic scholar 
 Tahir Jalaluddin, ulama in Malaysia and Singapore
 Tuanku Nan Renceh, ulama
 Tuanku Nan Tuo, ulama
 Tuanku Pasaman, ulama

Singers

 Afgansyah Reza, singer
 Aishah, singer
 Azmyl Yunor, singer-songwriter
 Carmit Bachar, pop singer
 Cita Citata, singer
 Dorce Gamalama, pop singer, actress, and presenter
 Fariz Rustam Munaf, pop singer
 Giring Ganesha, singer
 Harry Roesli, singer-songwriter
 Hetty Koes Endang, pop singer
 Irwansyah, actor and singer
 Laila Sari, singer
 Naura Ayu, singer
 Nazril Irham, singer
 Nindy Ayunda, singer
 Sandhy Sondoro, singer-songwriter 
 Sherina Munaf, singer-songwriter, actress
 Tulus, singer-songwriter
 Upiak Isil, singer, comedian 
 Vidi Aldiano, pop singer

Others
 Alexander Aan, atheist activist

See also
 Overseas Minangkabau
 List of Acehnese people
 List of Batak people
 List of Bugis people
 List of Chinese Indonesians
 List of Javanese people 
 List of Moluccan people
 List of Sundanese people

Minangkabau

Minangkabau